Kostas Vallianos (born 1 March 1937) is a Greek footballer. He played in eleven matches for the Greece national football team from 1960 to 1965.

References

External links
 

1937 births
Living people
Greece international footballers
Place of birth missing (living people)
Association footballers not categorized by position
Footballers from Athens
Greek footballers